Gymnopilus subearlei is a species of mushroom-forming fungus in the family Hymenogastraceae.

Description
The cap is bright yellow to pale off-white yellow with amber fibrous scales, and ranges from 0.25 — 1.25in. in diameter.
The stem is 0.25 — 2in. long and 0.06 — 0.25in. wide. It is white, fibrous, and stains yellow to brown where handled. The flesh of this mushroom stains blue and it contains the hallucinogen psilocybin. It has a yellowish-orange spore print.

See also

List of Gymnopilus species

Phylogeny
This species is in the lepidotus-subearlei infrageneric grouping of the genus Gymnopilus.

References

subearlei
Fungi described in 1981
Taxa named by Gastón Guzmán